Stanley Hepton (3 December 1932 – 15 April 2017) was an English professional footballer who played in the Football League for Blackpool, Huddersfield Town, Bury, Rochdale and Southport during the 1950s and 1960s.

References

1932 births
2017 deaths
Footballers from Leeds
English footballers
Association football midfielders
Blackpool F.C. players
Huddersfield Town A.F.C. players
Bury F.C. players
Rochdale A.F.C. players
Southport F.C. players
English Football League players